Terezinha João Calazans (born 20 October 1940) is a Brazilian singer-songwriter.

Biography
Born in Vitoria, the daughter of a mandolin player and the granddaughter of a conductor, Calazans began her professional career in 1964 as a member of the music and stage ensemble Construção, which also included Naná Vasconcelos and Geraldo Azevedo. 

Calazans made her record debut in 1967 with the single "Aquela rosa/Cirandas". After some television and stage experiences in 1970 she moved to France, where she formed the successful duo "Teca & Ricardo" with musician Ricardo Villas. After the dissolution of the duo in 1981, Calazans returned to Brazil, where she reprised her solo career and also worked as a songwriter for other prominent artists such as Gal Costa, Milton Nascimento, and Nara Leão. In the late 1980s she eventually decided to settle permanently in Paris, where she continued her musical activities. 

In 2002 Calazans was nominated for Best Portuguese Language Roots Album at the 4th Annual Latin Grammy Awards for the album Cantoria Brasileira.

References

External links 
 
  
 Teca Calazans at Enciclopédia Itaú Cultural

1940 births
Living people
People from Vitória, Espírito Santo
Brazilian singer-songwriters 
Música Popular Brasileira singers
20th-century Brazilian women singers
21st-century Brazilian women singers
Women in Latin music